Cardenal Caro Province is one of the three provinces of the central Chilean region of O'Higgins (VI). The capital of Cardenal Caro is Pichilemu.

Name
The province is named after Cardinal José María Caro Rodríguez, native of Pichilemu, and who was the first Cardinal of Chile.

History
On July 13, 1973, President Salvador Allende Gossens decreed the creation of the Cardenal Caro Department. The decree was published in the Diario Oficial de la República de Chile in August of the same year, making it official. Marchigüe was declared the capital. However, the coup d'état that occurred in September of that year made the decree "dead text".

The province of Cardenal Caro was created on October 3, 1979 by General Augusto Pinochet. The communes of Litueche (formerly El Rosario), La Estrella, Marchihue, Paredones, and Pichilemu, originally from Colchagua Province; and Navidad, originally from San Antonio Province, formed the province.

Administration
As a province, Cardenal Caro is a second-level administrative division of Chile, governed by a provincial delegate who is appointed by the president. Before 2021, the province was administered by the governor of Cardenal Caro, also appointed by the president of the Republic. The province is composed by six communes (Spanish: comunas), each of which is governed by a popularly elected alcalde.

Communes

Geography and demography
Between the 1992 and 2002 censuses, the population grew by 11.2% (4,151 persons). persons).

See also
List of schools in Cardenal Caro

Further reading

References

External links

 Government of Cardenal Caro 

 
Provinces of O'Higgins Region
Provinces of Chile